Guðmundur Guðmundsson (11 May 1918 – 20 April 1974) was an Icelandic chess player, Icelandic Chess Championship winner (1954).

Biography
From the late 1930s to late 1950s, Guðmundur Guðmundsson was also one of the leading Icelandic chess players. In 1947, he played in Hastings International Chess Congress and Nordic Chess Championship. In 1954, Guðmundur Guðmundsson won the Icelandic Chess Championship.

Guðmundur Guðmundsson played for Iceland in the Chess Olympiad:
 In 1954, at second board in the 11th Chess Olympiad in Amsterdam (+2, =6, -5).

References

External links

Guðmundur Guðmundsson chess games at 365chess.com

1918 births
1974 deaths
Icelandic chess players
Chess Olympiad competitors
20th-century chess players